The National Helium Reserve, also known as the Federal Helium Reserve, is a strategic reserve of the United States holding over 1 billion cubic meters (about 170,000,000 kg) of helium gas. The reserve was established with the enactment of the Helium Act of 1925. The strategic supply provisioned the noble gas for airships, and in the 1950s became an important source of coolant during the Cold War and Space Race.

The facilities were located close to the Hugoton and other natural gas fields in southwest Kansas and the panhandle of Oklahoma, plus the Panhandle Field in Texas.  These fields contain natural gas with unusually high percentages of helium—from 0.3% to 2.7%—and constitute the United States' largest helium source.  The helium is separated as a byproduct from the produced natural gas.

After the Helium Acts Amendments of 1960 (Public Law 86–666), the U.S. Bureau of Mines arranged for five private plants to recover helium from natural gas. For this helium conservation program, the Bureau built a  pipeline from Bushton, Kansas, to connect those plants with the government's partially depleted Cliffside gas field. This helium-nitrogen mixture was injected and stored in the Cliffside gas field until needed, when it then was further purified.

By 1995, a billion cubic metres of the gas had been collected, and the reserve was US$1.4 billion in debt, prompting Congress to begin phasing out the reserve in 1996. The resulting "Helium Privatization Act of 1996" (Public Law 104–273) directed the Department of the Interior to start selling off the reserve by 2005.

By 2007, the federal government was reported as auctioning off the Amarillo Helium Plant. The National Helium Reserve itself was reported as "slowly being drawn down and sold to private industry." By early 2011, the facility was still in government hands. In May 2013, the House of Representatives voted to extend the life of the reserve under government control.

In August 2019, the NPR show Planet Money described the history of the reserve and government policies that helped create a shortage of the gas.

See also
 Helium production in the United States
 Masterson, Texas
 Helium storage and conservation

References

Further reading

External links
Federal Helium Program
www.newscientist.com - Article on Helium.
Helium, when will it run out?
New York Times article with map
Responsible Helium Administration and Stewardship Act (H.R. 527) October 2013
Historic American Engineering Record (HAER) documentation:

1925 establishments in the United States
Buildings and structures in Potter County, Texas
Helium
Historic American Engineering Record in Texas
Strategic reserves of the United States